Gabriela ("Gabi") Lesch (born 17 August 1964 in Sulzbach, Hesse) is a retired German runner who specialized in the 800 metres. She represented West Germany at the 1988 Seoul Olympics.

She represented the sports clubs TSV Kirchhain and Eintracht Frankfurt, and became West German champion in 1988, 1989 and 1990. Her personal best time was 1:59.24 minutes, achieved in June 1991 in Helsinki.

International competitions

References

External links

1964 births
Living people
People from Main-Taunus-Kreis
Sportspeople from Darmstadt (region)
German female middle-distance runners
West German female middle-distance runners
Universiade medalists in athletics (track and field)
Athletes (track and field) at the 1988 Summer Olympics
Olympic athletes of West Germany
Universiade silver medalists for Germany
Medalists at the 1991 Summer Universiade
Medalists at the 1989 Summer Universiade
20th-century German women